Answers Come in Dreams is an album by Meat Beat Manifesto.  It consists of lengthy ambient, glitch, and dubstep-focused pieces, with an attention to texture rather than the raw sampling and breakbeat rhythms seen on many of the group's previous releases.

Track listing

US CD Metropolis 
 "Luminol" - 6:05
 "Mnemonic" - 5:58
 "MYC" - 7:09
 "Let Me Set" - 5:40
 "# Zero" - 4:37
 "Quietus" - 6:33
 "Token Words" - 6:48
 "Waterphone" - 9:23
 "010130" - 1:02
 "Zenta!" - 5:09
 "Please" - 5:23
 "Chimie Du Son" - 9:18

UK CD Hydrogen Dukebox 
 "010130" - 1:04
 "Quietus" - 4:30
 "Mnemonic" - 4:20
 "Luminol" - 6:04
 "Please" - 5:24
 "# Zero" - 4:36
 "Token Words" - 6:50
 "Waterphone" - 8:05
 "Let Me Set" - 5:39
 "Chimie Du Son" - 6:27

Personnel
Jack Dangers - performer, producer
Dave Dasher - programming, sounds (on "MYC")

References

2010 albums
Meat Beat Manifesto albums
Metropolis Records albums
Albums produced by Jack Dangers